Rohov can refer to
 Rohov (Opava District), a village in the Moravian-Silesian Region (Opava District) of the Czech Republic
 Rohov, Senica, a village in the Trnava Region (Senica District) of Slovakia